Joses MacPaulson Nawo  is a Solomon Islands footballer who plays as a midfielder for Henderson Eels in the Telekom S-League.

International career

International goals
Scores and results list Solomon Islands' goal tally first.

Personal life
Joses has a younger brother, called Boni Pride, who also plays for the Solomon Islands national football team.

References 

1988 births
Living people
Solomon Islands footballers
Solomon Islands international footballers
Hekari United players
People from Honiara
Association football midfielders
Nalkutan F.C. players
Expatriate footballers in Vanuatu
Expatriate footballers in Papua New Guinea
Solomon Islands expatriate sportspeople in Vanuatu
Solomon Islands expatriate sportspeople in Papua New Guinea
2012 OFC Nations Cup players
2016 OFC Nations Cup players